Netherlands women's national under-17 football team represents Netherlands in international youth football competitions.

FIFA U-17 Women's World Cup

As of 2022, the team has never qualified for the  FIFA U-17 Women's World Cup.

UEFA Women's Under-17 Championship 

The team has qualified five times for the UEFA Women's Under-17 Championship. The best result was second place (2019).

See also
Netherlands women's national football team
Netherlands women's national under-19 football team
FIFA U-17 Women's World Cup
UEFA Women's Under-17 Championship

References

External links 
  

Netherlands
Football
National